North Yeoval is a locality in New South Wales, Australia. It is the part of the village of Yeoval which lies within Dubbo Regional Council.  The majority of the Village lies within the Cabonne shire. The dividing line is the Buckinbah Creek. North Yeoval is where the railway station was located as well as where the grain silos and bulk head are positioned. The Yeoval cemetery is also located in North Yeoval.

External links
Australian cemetery  index

Towns in the Central West (New South Wales)
Dubbo Regional Council